Mayton Eugenio (born Mayton Eugenio; 14 September 1992 in Quezon City, Philippines), is a Filipina commercial model, actress and dancer. 

She is well-known as the daughter of veteran choreographer and one of the Philippines' famous dance icons, Geleen Eugenio, and has been cast in various roles such as Weng Dimagiba in the horror-thriller series Dormitoryo in GMA Network.

In 2015, Eugenio finished her culinary course at the Center for Asian Culinary Studies, under Café Ysabel.

In 2016, she signed a contract with Viva Artists Agency.

Filmography

Television

Movies

References

External links
Mayton Eugenio at GMANetwork.com

1988 births
Living people
Filipino television actresses
People from Quezon City
Actresses from Metro Manila
GMA Network personalities
Viva Artists Agency